There were two United States House of Representatives elections in Wyoming in 1890, both held on September 11, 1890. Republican lawyer Clarence D. Clark defeated Democratic George T. Beck with 58.22% of the vote and became the first person to represent Wyoming in the House of Representatives.

Results

References

Wyoming
1890
1890 Wyoming elections